Yones Emami (born 30 March 1997) is an Iranian wrestler. He won two Bronze medal at the 2019 World Wrestling Championships and 2022 World Wrestling Championships.

References

Living people
Iranian male sport wrestlers
World Wrestling Championships medalists
1997 births
Asian Wrestling Championships medalists
21st-century Iranian people